Pizzo della Croce is a mountain of Lombardy, Italy. It has an elevation of 1,491 metres.

Lugano Prealps
Mountains of Lombardy
Mountains of the Alps